James H. Wilson (March 6, 1940 – March 27, 2013) was an American football coach.  He was the 25th head football coach at The Apprentice School in Newport News, Virginia and he held that position for four seasons, from 1971 until 1974.  His coaching record at Apprentice was 13–20.

Death
Wilson died on March 29, 2013, in Hampton, Virginia.

References

1940 births
2013 deaths
The Apprentice Builders football coaches